The 1996–97 Courage League Division 4 North was the tenth full season of rugby union within the fourth tier of the English league system, currently known as National League 2 North, and the last using the name Division 4 North.  Changes to the league structure by the RFU at the start of the season saw Courage League 4 revert to two regional divisions (Courage League Division 4 North and Courage League Division 4 South), while the regional leagues below (Courage League Division 5) was split back into regional leagues - North 1, Midlands 1, London 1 and South West 1.  This meant that National Division 4 North increased from 10 to 14 teams (28 overall) with multiple teams coming up from the discontinued Division 5.

Worcester were deserving champions, going undefeated in the league to take the title and only promotion spot to the 1997–98 National Division 1 (formerly Courage Division 3), 11 points clear of runners up Birmingham & Solihull.  While Worcester were deserving champions, Stoke-on-Trent and Hereford were easily the worst teams in the division and as a consequence were the two sides to go down, well short of safety.  Both sides would drop to Midlands 1.  The reason Division 4 North had less relegation places compared to Division 4 North (2 to 4) was that 3 out of 4 of the teams relegated from the division above were based in the south of the country, requiring more places to accommodate for their arrival the following season.

Structure

Each team played home and away matches against each of the other teams, playing a total of twenty-six matches each. The league champions were promoted to the new-look National League 1 while the bottom four sides dropped to either North 1 or Midlands 1 depending on locality.

Participating teams and locations

League table

Sponsorship
Courage League Division 4 North is part of the Courage Clubs Championship and is sponsored by Courage Brewery.  This was their tenth and final season of sponsorship.

Notes

References

N4
National League 2 North